The 1964–65 Allsvenskan was the 31st season of the top division of Swedish handball. 10 teams competed in the league. Redbergslids IK won the league and claimed their eighth Swedish title. IK Heim and LUGI were relegated.

League table

References 

Swedish handball competitions